The 2008 Hamilton 400 was the third round of the 2008 V8 Supercar season. It was held on the weekend of 18 to 20 April on the streets of Hamilton, in the Waikato region of the North Island of New Zealand.

Race 1
Race 1 was held on Saturday 19 April. Garth Tander took his fourth consecutive win after clean-sheeting at Albert Park. The race wasn't without incident though as Mark Winterbottom and Shane van Gisbergen collided with each other off the start line while Greg Murphy was spun around by Mark Skaife at the exit of turn 1.

The chaos continued into turn 2 when Van Gisbergen locked up while Russell Ingall went down the inside of a Steven Johnson car which caused a collision collecting Paul Morris, Shane Price, Michael Patrizi, Steven Johnson and Craig Lowndes. Johnson, Price and Ingall retired to the pits. Steven Richards had managed to run wide at turn 5 which gave the lead to Tander and gave Rick Kelly second place. The Safety Car was deployed until the end of lap 5. The Safety Car was back on track at the end of that lap though thanks to an incident for Patrizi at turn 7. Most people pulled into the pits except for a few people like Mark Skaife. This decision, forced by HRT's decision to pit Tander first, would cost Skaife dearly later in the race. The Safety Car pulled in on lap 11 and racing resumed.

Jason Richards and Lowndes were both given drive through penalties for pitlane infringements after Murphy pulled into pitlane with a broken steering plate. Murphy returned to the track 2 laps later to the delight of the crowd and Paul Morris had also returned to the track.

Skaife pitted on lap 20 and fell well down the order while Caruso spun his GRM Holden Commodore. Craig Lowndes entered pitlane on lap 26 for a flat tyre when he clipped the tyre bundle at turn 4. Andrew Jones pulled into the garage to retire at lap 30. Van Gisbergen also pitted on lap 33 for some damage and was subsequently lapped. In the end Tander won from Rick Kelly and Steven Richards.

Race 2
Race 2 was held on Sunday 20 April. A fifth consecutive victory for Garth Tander in Race 2.

Race 3
Race 3 was held on Sunday 20 April. Six on the trot wrapped up the round victory for Garth Tander.

Results

Qualifying 
Steven Richards gave the big New Zealand crowd something to cheer about, securing pole position in the Ford Performance Racing Falcon after Garth Tander's last-ditch effort fell five hundredths short. Rick Kelly was third fastest ahead of Stone Brothers Racing driver James Courtney. Crowd favourite, Greg Murphy made a welcome return to the top ten in seventh. Michael Caruso, who has struggled since graduating since arriving in the V8 Supercar Championship Series, was a top performer, topping one of the practice sessions and backing it up with eighth grid position, three behind his Garry Rogers Motorsport teammate Lee Holdsworth. A heavy practice crash limited Round 2 winner Will Davison's progress to 16th, while Jamie Whincup looked a good bet for pole position until he crashed heavily after contact with Todd Kelly. The car was not repairable and the series points leader was reduced to a spectator for the weekend. A miserable weekend for Triple Eight Race Engineering saw Craig Lowndes qualify back in 21st, caught out by the changeable weather in the first part of qualifying, failing to make the first qualifying cut.

Race 1 results

Race 2 results

Race 3 results

Standings
After round 3 of 14

Support categories
The 2008 Hamilton 400 had four support categories.

References

External links
Official timing and results

Hamilton 400
Hamilton 400
Ham
April 2008 sports events in New Zealand